The Quiksilver Pro France is an event on the World Surf League (WSL) Championship Tour. The event is held every year at Seignosse, Capbreton and Hossegor in France at the end of September and in the beginning of October.

Results



2017

2016

2015

Preceding years 

2001: Contest cancelled due to 9/11 attacks?

2000: Winner was C.J. Hobgood, USA

 Other renowned competitors 
 Taj Burrow
 Jérémy Florès
 Tom Curren
 Joan Duru
 Mikael Picon

See also

 Quiksilver
 Roxy Pro France
 Quiksilver Pro
 Roxy Pro Gold Coast

References

External links
 World Surf League (WSL) official site

 
World Surf League
Surfing competitions in France
Sport in Landes (department)
2002 establishments in France
Recurring sporting events established in 2002